Canadian property law, or property law in Canada, is the body of law concerning the rights of individuals over land, objects, and expression within Canada. It encompasses personal property, real property, and intellectual property. Unlike multiple other first world countries, the right to own property is only included through the Bill of Rights, an ordinary Federal law, rather than constitutionalized through the Canadian Charter of Rights and Freedoms.

Personal property laws are typically governed by provincial legislation such as the provincial Sale of Goods Acts. Likewise, the common law rules inherited from the United Kingdom are largely still in force. Real property law is likewise a matter of provincial legislation with the incorporation of English common law rules.

Intellectual property, as with most common law countries, remains entirely based in federal statute; however, there are common-law economic torts related to intellectual property, e.g., passing off. Canada tried to take the middle road between the United Kingdom and the United States in many of their intellectual property laws. Copyright law and trademark law in Canada was initially based on the English legislation but has since incorporated many changes from the US model and other places. Canadian patent law, however, was initially based on US legislation but has typically favoured the application of UK case law.

On January 1, 2023, Canada enacted a law prohibiting foreigners, except for immigrants and permanent residents, from acquiring residential areas in the country for two years in response to a real-estate bubble.

References